Giovanni Stroppa (born 24 January 1968) is an Italian professional football coach and former player who   was most recently head coach of Serie A club Monza.

Club career

AC Milan and loan to Monza 
Stroppa started his playing career in AC Milan's youth system, and was loaned for two seasons at Monza, a de facto Milan feeder club at the time. He returned to Milan in 1989, making his professional senior debut for the club in the Coppa Italia on 23 August, in a 0–0 away draw against Parma; Milan later reached the Coppa Italia final, only to be defeated by Juventus. He made his Serie A debut on 27 August 1989, in a 3–0 away win over Cesena, marking the occasion by scoring a long-range goal. Stroppa finished his first season with the team by winning a European Cup, a European Super Cup, and an Intercontinental Cup in 1990, under coach Arrigo Sacchi.

Lazio and Foggia 
In 1991, he signed for Lazio, and in 1993 he moved to Foggia, then an outsider Serie A team known for their spectacular, offensive style of play under coach Zdeněk Zeman.

Return to AC Milan 
After an impressive season with Foggia, he returned to the Stadio San Siro to play with Milan for a single season, winning his third UEFA Super Cup with the club, as well as the Supercoppa Italiana. In total, Stroppa made 85 appearances for Milan, scoring nine goals; he made his final appearance for the club in a 1–0 away defeat to Napoli, in Serie A, on 18 May 1995.

Final years 
After leaving Milan, Stroppa then played two seasons with Udinese, and two seasons and a half with Piacenza, before joining Brescia in the 2001 winter transfer market. After a few other experiences with Genoa in Serie B, Alzano Virescit of Serie C1 and Avellino of Serie B, he returned to Foggia, in Serie C1, in 2004.

International career 
Stroppa's notable performances for the club even allowed him to make his debut for the Italy national football team on 13 October 1993, in a 3–1 home win over Scotland; in total, he made four appearances for Italy between 1993 and 1994, under his former Milan manager Sacchi.

Managerial career

AC Milan U21 
Stroppa was coach of Milan's under-21 team for the 2010–11 season, but was relieved of his duties on 11 June 2011, with a year still to run on his contract, and just one week after losing 1–0 to Roma in the quarter-finals of the Campionato Primavera.

Südtirol 
On 13 July 2011 he was unveiled as new head coach of Südtirol.

Pescara 
On 8 June 2012, he was named head coach of Serie A newcomers Pescara, replacing Zdeněk Zeman, his former boss during his first spell as a player at Foggia, who was signed by Roma a few days before his appointment. He was assisted by Andrea Guerra, Francesco Sità, Andrea Tonelli and Massimo Marini. He resigned as coach of Pescara on 18 November 2012, after a series of bad results and the team has fallen in the middle of the relegation zone. He left the club along with Guerra (vice-coach) and two assistants Sità and Tonelli.

Spezia 
In June 2013, he was named new head coach of Serie B club Spezia.

Return to Südtirol 
On 20 April 2015, Stroppa returned as head coach of Südtirol; ending the 2014–15 season in tenth place. The following season, Stroppa helped the side finish in tenth place once again. On 12 May 2016, Südtirol communicated that Stroppa's contract would not be renewed following its expiration on 30 June.

Foggia 
On 14 August 2016, he was appointed by Foggia. He reached a promotion to Serie B with the Pugliese team.

Crotone 
In June 2018, Stroppa was appointed as coach of Crotone, replacing Walter Zenga. Crotone announced the dismissal of Stroppa on 29 October 2018. He was reinstated as head coach on 28 December 2018, following the resignation of Massimo Oddo, who had previously replaced him in charge of the Calabrian club.

Since his return at Crotone, Stroppa led the Calabrian club to twelfth place in his first season, and was awarded a new contract. On his second season, he led Crotone to automatic promotion to Serie A, leading the Rossoblu back to the top flight after a two-year absence. His debut season as a Serie A manager however did not prove to be successful, as Crotone struggled to stay out of the relegation zone, leading to Stroppa being sacked on 1 March 2021.

Monza 
On 28 May 2021, it was announced that Stroppa would be appointed head coach of Monza on 1 July. He returned to the club 32 years after his experience as a player. Stroppa's first win as a Monza coach came on 29 August, helping his side win 1–0 at home against Cremonese.

He guided Monza to fourth place in the regular season, missing out on automatic promotion following a 0–1 loss to Perugia in the final game, which allowed Cremonese and Pisa to overtake the Biancorossi, who were placed in second place with one game to go. In the promotion playoff tournament, Monza entered in the semifinals, where they eliminated Brescia, and then defeated Pisa in a two-legged final on a 6–4 aggregate result (after extra time), thus ensuring themselves a historical first promotion to Serie A in the 110-year club history.

Confirmed in charge of the Brianzoli for the club's debut Serie A season, Stroppa was however dismissed on 13 September 2022 after achieving only one point in the first six games of the season.

Style of play
A quick, energetic, and talented, yet injury-prone player, Stroppa was mainly known for his technical skills, and his ability to create chances for teammates, which enabled him to play in several creative midfield and attacking roles: he was initially deployed as an attacking midfielder, or as a supporting striker, but he was also used as a winger, and even as a central midfielder on occasion; he later played as a deep-lying playmaker during the final seasons of his career.

Career statistics

Managerial

Honours

Player
AC Milan
European Cup: 1989–90
UEFA Super Cup: 1989, 1990, 1994
Intercontinental Cup: 1989, 1990
Supercoppa Italiana: 1994

References

External links 

 
 

1968 births
Living people
Sportspeople from the Province of Lodi
Italian footballers
Association football midfielders
A.C. Milan players
A.C. Monza players
S.S. Lazio players
Calcio Foggia 1920 players
Udinese Calcio players
Piacenza Calcio 1919 players
Brescia Calcio players
Genoa C.F.C. players
Virtus Bergamo Alzano Seriate 1909 players
U.S. Avellino 1912 players
Serie A players
Serie B players
Serie C players
Italy youth international footballers
Italy under-21 international footballers
Italy B international footballers
Italy international footballers
Italian football managers
F.C. Südtirol managers
Delfino Pescara 1936 managers
Spezia Calcio managers
Calcio Foggia 1920 managers
F.C. Crotone managers
A.C. Monza managers
A.C. Milan non-playing staff
Serie A managers
Serie B managers
Footballers from Lombardy